Greetings From... is the debut EP from A Rocket to the Moon, an American rock band. It was released through Fueled by Ramen on October 14, 2008. The album peaked at #21 on the Billboard Top Heatseekers chart.

Track listing
The track "Just Another One" features John O'Callaghan from The Maine and Justin Richards from Brighten. "Dakota" reappears on their full-length debut On Your Side.
"If Only They Knew" – 2:33
"Dakota" – 3:31
"I'm Not Saying Goodbye" – 3:18
"Fear of Flying" – 3:56
"Just Another One" – 4:19

References

2008 debut EPs
A Rocket to the Moon albums
Fueled by Ramen EPs